Lower Kalskag is a city in Bethel Census Area, Alaska, United States. It is twenty-six miles west of Aniak. At the 2010 census the population was 282, up from 267 in 2000.

Geography
Lower Kalskag is located at  (61.513735, -160.359050).

Lower Kalskag, referred to by the locals as just "Lower", is linked to Upper Kalskag (Upper) by a single two mile maintained gravel/dirt road.

Lower Kalskag is accessible only by small plane, boat, and vehicles via the river "ice road" (Winter only).

Demographics

Lower Kalskag first appeared on the 1940 U.S. Census erroneously as the unincorporated village of Kalskag. In 1950, it reported as Lower Kalskag. It formally incorporated in 1969.

As of the census of 2000, there were 267 people, 66 households, and 54 families residing in the city. The racial makeup of the city was 4.49% White, 88.76% Native American, and 6.74% from two or more races.

There were 66 households, out of which 62.1% had children under the age of 18 living with them, 47.0% were married couples living together, 24.2% had a female householder with no husband present, and 16.7% were non-families. 15.2% of all households were made up of individuals, and 1.5% had someone living alone who was 65 years of age or older.  The average household size was 4.05 and the average family size was 4.53.

In the city, the population was spread out, with 44.9% under the age of 18, 13.5% from 18 to 24, 22.1% from 25 to 44, 15.4% from 45 to 64, and 4.1% who were 65 years of age or older.  The median age was 21 years. For every 100 females, there were 96.3 males.  For every 100 females age 18 and over, there were 98.6 males.

The median income for a household in the city was $25,625, and the median income for a family was $27,500. Males had a median income of $16,667 versus $36,250 for females. The per capita income for the city was $7,654.  About 36.7% of families and 40.6% of the population were below the poverty line, including 51.4% of those under the age of eighteen and 35.7% of those 65 or over.

References

Cities in Bethel Census Area, Alaska
Cities in Alaska